Miká Heming (born 6 April 2000) is a German racing cyclist, who currently rides for UCI ProTeam .

Major results

2020
 1st  Mountains classification, Belgrade–Banja Luka
2021
 5th International Rhodes Grand Prix
 10th Poreč Trophy
2022
 1st Stage 3 International Tour of Rhodes
 3rd Overall Flèche du Sud
 3rd Overall Baltic Chain Tour
 5th Overall Tour of Romania
1st  Young rider classification
 5th International Rhodes Grand Prix
 5th Visegrad 4 Kerékpárverseny
 6th Overall Carpathian Couriers Race
1st Stage 2
 6th Overall Gemenc Grand Prix
 8th Grand Prix Herning
 9th Visegrad 4 Bicycle Race – GP Slovakia

References

External links

2000 births
Living people
German male cyclists
People from Ahaus